Cannonsville was a town in Delaware County in Upstate New York. The town was founded in the late 18th century and survived until 1964, when it was flooded to create the Cannonsville Reservoir, which is part of the Delaware System and provides water to New York City. Its site is located in the present-day town of Tompkins. Cannonsville was named after Benjamin Cannon, Sr. He is alternately credited with building the town's first house, and being its first Postmaster.

In 1960, Jules Victor Schwerin produced the documentary film Indian Summer about the destruction of Cannonsville and the creation of the Cannonsville Reservoir. The film included Grant Rogers, a Catskill singer/songwriter as well as other townspeople. American folk singers Pete and Mike Seeger did the music for the film. In 2022 Indian Summer was digitally restored from the original 35mm film elements and preserved back onto 35mm film by Charles Cadkin and BB Optics, Inc. The original film elements reside in the Museum of Modern Art's permanent collection.

2023 saw the premiere of a new short film, The Fall of Cannonsville by Charles Cadkin at the Museum of Modern Art alongside the newly preserved copy of Indian Summer. The Fall of Cannonsville features interviews conducted in 2019 and 2022 with Cannonsville residents paired with archival material and landscape footage of the area.

References

External links 
 Cannonsville: A memorial to a town that was sacrificed for New York City
 Delaware County NY Genealogy and History site

Former towns in New York (state)
Populated places in Delaware County, New York
Populated places disestablished in 1964
1964 disestablishments in New York (state)